Hugh H. Janeway (December 3, 1865 – January 1, 1921) was an American football player, coach, and referee. He served as the co-head football coach with H. H. Vincent at Lafayette College in 1894, compiling a record of 5–6. Janeway played college football at Princeton University, where was a member of the 1889 Princeton Tigers football team, later recognized as a consensus national champion. He was also the captain of Princeton's track team in 1889. Janeway served as the head referee for the 1891 Yale vs. Crescent Athletic Club contest.

Janeway was born on December 3, 1865, in Plainfield, New Jersey. He died suddenly on January 1, 1921, in Philadelphia, Pennsylvania.

Head coaching record

References

External links
 

1865 births
1921 deaths
19th-century players of American football
19th-century sports officials
American football guards
Princeton Tigers football players
Princeton Tigers men's track and field athletes
Lafayette Leopards football coaches
People from Plainfield, New Jersey
Players of American football from New Jersey
Track and field athletes from New Jersey